Pico Far East Holdings Limited is an event marketing company founded in 1969 by Chia Siong Lim, was named Pico Art Studio. It Incorporated in Singapore as a private limited company delivering exhibition stand-building work. It was listed on the Hong Kong Stock Exchange under the name Pico Far East Holdings Limited, the chairman of the group is Lawrence Chia.

History 
Pico was founded in 1969, it is a global agency with some 2,500 staff in 35 offices located in major cities around the world. Pico is building large operations and production facilities in Beijing and Shanghai called Pico Creative Centres.  The bulk of Pico's work has involved designing and building exhibition stands and managing and providing services at mega-events like World Expos or Olympic Games.

Stock exchange 
Pico has been listed on the Hong Kong Stock Exchange (SEHK: 0752) since 1992, and their associate Pico (Thailand) Public Company Limited has been listed on Thailand’s MAI (SET: PICO) since 2004.

Subsidiaries and affiliates 
Pico subsidiaries and affiliates:

Pico+ 
Three subsidiaries of Pico are under the subsidiaries network Pico+:
 TBA Creative Network
 TBA Creative Network is a brand activation agency.  Focusing on below-the-line interactive marketing services, their business domain includes branding strategies, events, exhibition, conference, and experiential marketing.
 PLUS Communications
 PIXELS

Other Subsidiaries:

Pico X
Pico X is Pico's strategic digital business unit, which provides digital strategy, business analytics and creative technology services.
IMT
P3 Innovation
 MP International (MPI)
A.E. Smith
 World Image
 Epicentro
 Chenzhou International Convention and Exhibition Centre
 Sri Lanka Exhibition and Convention Centre
 Fairtrans International
Global Spectrum Asia
 Local Projects

References 

Marketing companies
Mass media companies of Hong Kong
Marketing companies established in 1969
Companies listed on the Hong Kong Stock Exchange
1969 establishments in Hong Kong